The School of Nursing is the graduate school of nursing at Columbia University in the Washington Heights neighborhood of Manhattan, New York City. Founded in 1892, it stands as one of the oldest nursing schools in the United States.

The School of Nursing was the first nursing school to award a master's degree in a clinical specialty. The school was the first to be elected a World Health Organization Collaborating Center for International Nursing Development in Advanced Practice.

History
After Presbyterian Hospital was established in 1872, administrators had trouble finding competent staff and recognized a need for qualified nurses. In 1892, the School of Nursing was founded as the Presbyterian Hospital Training School for Nurses, with Anna C. Maxwell serving as its first dean. The early curriculum at the school, taught mostly by physicians, included such varied subjects as hygiene of the sickroom, bacteriology, anatomy, bandaging, symptomatology, surgical diseases, obstetrics and gynecology, contagious diseases, nervous cases, Swedish massage, and cooking for the homebound. On May 15, 1894, 21 students, all females, became members of the first graduating class. Maxwell Hall opened within the new Columbia-Presbyterian Medical Center in 1928. In 1937, the nursing school formally became affiliated with Columbia University. The first Bachelor of Science degrees were awarded to students in 1940.

In 1956, the School of Nursing became the first in the country to award a master's degree in a clinical nursing specialty. The emphasis on clinical scholarship is considered appropriate due to collaboration of the School of Nursing with other professional schools at Columbia. In 1984, the school's new home became the Georgian Building. In 2017, the nursing school moved into a new 68,000-square-foot building designed by the architectural firms of FXFOWLE in New York and CO Architects in Los Angeles. The School of Nursing shares the Columbia University Medical Center campus with the School of Public Health, the School of Dental and Oral Surgery, and the College of Physicians and Surgeons. The school has built a tradition of clinical excellence by having clinical partnerships at over 200 clinical practice sites throughout New York City. The School of Nursing also has affiliations with three major medical centers: New York-Presbyterian, Mount Sinai Hospital, and Mount Sinai Morningside.

Academics
The School of Nursing offers a number of degree programs for the training of Registered Nurses, Nurse Practitioners, Certified Nurse Midwives, Nurse Anesthetists, Clinical Nurse Leaders, and Nurse-Scientists.

It offers a 15-month accelerated Master's Direct Entry (MDE) program for non-nurse college graduates. A Doctor of Nursing Practice (DNP) program for established Registered Nurses (Lateral-entry) or through their combined (MDE/DNP) seamless entry option, offering six Advanced Practice specialties: Adult-Gerontology Acute Care NP, Adult-Gerontology Primary Care NP, Family NP, Nurse-Midwifery, Pediatric-Primary Care NP, and Psychiatric-Mental Health NP. The school also offers a competitive Master of Science degree in Nurse Anesthesia, and a Master of Clinical Management and Leadership. A research-based Doctorate of Philosophy (Ph.D) degree is also offered, with research focus areas across the gamma of healthcare.

The clinical-based Doctor of Nursing Practice (D.N.P.) degree was first developed by the school's faculty in 2004 as one of the first such programs in the nation. The additional competencies embodied in this degree were based on the experience and outcomes research of the clinical faculty. It is the first 'advanced practice' doctorate involving direct and comprehensive patient care of a panel of patients across sites and over time in the whole country.

As clinical evidence is both built from and applied to practice, the School of Nursing provides its students with the Acute Care Nurse Practitioner (ACNP) program in order to achieve evidence-based practice(EBP). The ACNP program was reconfigured to incorporate both theoretical and practical skills to foster an approach to clinical care geared toward older adults and persons with disabilities. The 47-credit masters ACNP program consist of core courses, supporting sciences, and specialty courses.

Core courses and supporting sciences for all nurse practitioners include physiology, pathophysiology, pharmacology, introduction to primary care, advanced physical assessment, genetics, health and social policy, and theory and research.

Deans
 Anna C. Maxwell (1892–1921)
 Helen Young (1921–1937)
 Margaret Conrad (1937–1950)
 Eleanor Lee (1950-1961)
 Elizabeth Gill (1961–1968)
 Mary Crawford (1968-1976)
 Helen Pettit (1976-1981)
 Joann S. Jamann-Riley (1981-1985)
 Mary Mundinger (1986-2010)
 Bobbie Berkowitz (2010-2018)
 Lorraine Frazier (2018–present)

Facility

In June 2017, the School of Nursing moved into a new seven story-building at the corner of West 168th Street and Audubon Avenue, at the east end of the Columbia University Medical Center campus in northern Manhattan. The 68,000-square-foot glass structure was designed by CO|FXFOWLE, a joint venture of two award-winning architecture firms. The building includes the Helene Fuld Health Trust Simulation Center to help students learn complex clinical techniques and includes a mock in-patient room, exam room, critical care unit, an operation room, and three teaching skill labs.

References

External links

Columbia University
Educational institutions established in 1892
Nursing schools in New York City
1892 establishments in New York (state)